Tiruchirappalli East may refer to:
 Tiruchirappalli East taluk
 Tiruchirappalli East (state assembly constituency)